Chersomanes is a genus of larks in the family Alaudidae found in southern and southeastern Africa.

It contains the two species:

References

 
Bird genera
Taxa named by Jean Cabanis
Taxonomy articles created by Polbot